Eques auratus (Latin for "gilded knight"; abbreviated eq. aur.) may refer to:
 Knight Bachelor in the English/British honours system
 Knight of the Golden Spur (Holy Roman Empire)
 Knight of the Golden Spur (Hungary)